This is a list of surveys of households in the United States.

10,000+ participants

1,000 to 9,999 participants

References

Household surveys